T Andromedae (T And) is a variable star of the Mira type in the constellation Andromeda. Like all the stars of this kind, T And is a cool asymptotic giant branch star of spectral type M4e-M7.5e. Its brightness varies periodically, completing a cycle in 281 days. The peak luminosity, however, is different every variability cycle, but can reach a peak magnitude mv=7.70.

Thomas David Anderson discovered that T Andromedae is a variable star, in 1894. The next year, Edward Charles Pickering examined archival photographic plates to derive a light curve for the star, and calculated a period of 281 days.

Measurements of the angular size variations of T And made with the Palomar Testbed Interferometer show no clear correlation with the star's brightness variations.

References

External links
Image

Andromeda (constellation)
001795
Mira variables
Andromedae
M-type giants
Emission-line stars
Durchmusterung objects